John Doe is an Italian comic book by Roberto Recchioni and Lorenzo Bartoli, published by Eura Editoriale. Graphically, it was created by Massimo Carnevale, who is also the current cover artist. Artist who worked for the series include Alessio Fortunato, Marco Farinelli, Walter Venturi and Riccardo Burchielli.

John Doe is an employee of "Trapassati Inc.", a firm dealing with the management of death. His direct superior is Death herself, portrayed as a very beautiful and sarcastic woman. Doe has a relationship with Tempo (which is the Italian word for "Time"), who is in fact an incarnation of time itself. In his missions, he is helped by several characters, some also employees of Trapassati Inc., other coming from the "Regno" (Italian word for "Kingdom"), a place out of space and time where figures such as War, Famine and Pestilence live.

References

Italian comics titles
Comics characters